Magic-City was an amusement park near Pont de l'Alma, two blocks east of the Eiffel Tower, in Paris from 1900 to 1934.

A large dance hall at 188 rue de l'Université in Paris was located in Magic-City. The venue was known for its "drag balls".

Brassaï, who photographed the events, wrote of an "immense, warm, impulsive fraternity" at Magic-City, saying "The cream of Parisian inverts was to meet there, without distinction as to class, race or age. And every type came, faggots, cruisers, chickens, old queens, famous antique dealers and young butcher boys, hairdressers and elevator boys, well-known dress designers and drag queens..."

Magic-City was closed by the authorities on February 6, 1934, and in 1942 the building was bought by the government and turned over to Paris-Télévision, which began broadcasting there in 1943.

Gallery

Notes 

Amusement parks in France
Defunct amusement parks in France
Entertainment venues in Paris
1900 establishments in France
1934 disestablishments in France
7th arrondissement of Paris
Former buildings and structures in Paris
Amusement parks closed in 1934
Amusement parks opened in 1900